Wilson R. Lourenço is a French-Brazilian arachnologist  specializing in scorpions.

Biography

Wilson R. Lourenço gained his PhD in evolutionary biology in 1978 from the Pierre and Marie Curie University in Paris, and a doctorate in population biology there in 1985. Since 1971 he has worked on the taxonomy, general biology, biogeography, and ecology of scorpions. He is an emeritus research fellow at the Muséum national d'histoire naturelle of Paris. He has published over 600 papers on scorpions, and books including the 2002 Scorpions of Brazil.

Dedicated taxa 
Other zoologists have named the following taxa after Lourenço:

Buthus lourencoi Rossi, Tropea & Yağmur, 2013
Diplocentrus lourencoi Stockwell, 1988
Lychas lourencoi Kovarík, 1997
Microchelifer lourencoi Heurtault, 1983
Rumikiru lourencoi Ojanguren & Affilastro, 2003 (formerly Orobothriurus lourencoi)
Simulium lourencoi Py & Daniel, 1988
Tityus lourencoi Flórez, 1996

Described taxa 

Lourenço has described the following taxa:

Afghanobuthus Lourenço, 2005
Afghanobuthus naumanni Lourenço, 2005
Ananteris ashmolei Lourenço, 1981
Ananteris bernabei Giupponi, Vasconcelos & Lourenço, 2009
Ananteris cachimboensis Lourenço, Motta & da Silva, 2006
Ananteris chagasi Giupponi, Vasconcelos & Lourenço, 2009
Ananteris charlescorfieldi Lourenço, 2001
Ananteris coineaui Lourenço, 1982
Ananteris columbiana Lourenço, 1991
Ananteris cryptozoicus Lourenço, 2005
Ananteris dacostai Ythier, Chevalier & Lourenço, 2020
Ananteris dekeyseri Lourenço, 1982
Ananteris deniseae Lourenço, 1997
Ananteris ehrlichi Lourenço, 1994
Ananteris elisabethae Lourenço, 2003
Ananteris evellynae Lourenço, 2004
Ananteris franckei Lourenço, 1982
Ananteris gorgonae Lourenço & Flórez, 1989
Ananteris guyanensis Lourenço & Monod, 1999
Ananteris kuryi Giupponi, Vasconcelos & Lourenço, 2009
Ananteris leilae Lourenço, 1999
Ananteris luciae Lourenço, 1984
Ananteris maniapurensis González-Sponga, 2006
Ananteris mamilihpan Ythier, Chevalier & Lourenço, 2020
Ananteris maranhensis Lourenço, 1987
Ananteris mariaelenae Lourenço, 1999
Ananteris mariaterezae Lourenço, 1987
Ananteris mauryi Lourenço, 1982
Ananteris nairae Lourenço, 2004
Ananteris pierrekondre Lourenço, Chevalier, Gangadin & Ythier, 2020
Ananteris platnicki Lourenço, 1993
Ananteris pydanieli Lourenço, 1982
Ananteris sabineae Lourenço, 2001
Ananteris sipilili Ythier, Chevalier & Lourenço, 2020
Ananteris tresor Ythier, Chevalier & Lourenço, 2020
Androctonus afghanus Lourenço & Qi, 2006
Androctonus aleksandrplotkini Lourenço & Qi, 2007
Androctonus dekeyseri Lourenço, 2005
Androctonus maelfaiti Lourenço, 2005
Androctonus maroccanus Lourenço, Ythier & Leguin, 2009
Apistobuthus susanae Lourenço, 1998
  Archaeobuthidae Lourenço, 2001
Archaeobuthus estephani Lourenço, 2001
Archaeobuthus Lourenço, 2001
Babycurus solegladi Lourenço, 2005
Belisariini Lourenço, 1998
Birulatus astartiae Stathi & Lourenço, 2003
Birulatus israelensis Lourenço, 2002
Bothriurus cerradoensis Lourenço, Motta, Godoi & Araújo, 2004
Brachistosternus simoneae Lourenço, 2000
Brazilobothriurus Lourenço & Monod, 2000
Brazilobothriurus pantanalensis Lourenço & Monod, 2000
Broteochactas amapaensis (Lourenço & Qi, 2007)
Broteochactas gonzalezspongai (Lourenço, 1983)
Broteochactas mascarenhasi (Lourenço, 1983)
Brotheas amazonicus Lourenço, 1988
Brotheas bolivianus (Lourenço, 2008)
Brotheas henriquesi Lourenço & Machado, 2004
Brotheas jourdani Lourenço, 1997
Brotheas overali Lourenço, 1988
Brotheas silvestris Lourenço, 1988
Buthacus birulai Lourenço, 2006
Buthacus clevai Lourenço, 2001
Buthacus huberi Lourenço, 2001
Buthacus mahraouii Lourenço, 2004
Buthacus maliensis Lourenço & Qi, 2007
Buthacus nigerianus Lourenço & Qi, 2006
Buthacus occidentalis Lourenço, 2000
Buthacus pakistanensis Lourenço & Qi, 2006
Buthacus striffleri Lourenço, 2004
Buthacus williamsi Lourenço & Leguin, 2009
Buthacus ziegleri Lourenço, 2000
Butheoloides annieae Lourenço, 1986
Butheoloides charlotteae Lourenço, 2000
Butheoloides hirsti Lourenço, 1996
Butheoloides occidentalis Lourenço, Slimani & Berahou, 2003
Butheoloides polisi Lourenço, 1996
Butheoloides schwendingeri Lourenço, 2002
Butheoloides wilsoni Lourenço, 1995
Butheoloides aymerichi Lourenço, 2002
Butheolus arabicus Lourenço & Qi, 2006
Buthus albengai Lourenço, 2003
Buthus bonito Lourenço & Geniez, 2005
Buthus brignolii Lourenço, 2003
Buthus draa Lourenço & Slimani, 2004
Buthus elhennawyi Lourenço, 2005
Buthus elizabethae Lourenço, 2005
Buthus elmoutaouakili Lourenço & Qi, 2006
Buthus ibericus Lourenço & Vachon, 2004
Buthus jianxinae Lourenço, 2005
Buthus lienhardi Lourenço, 2003
Buthus mariefranceae Lourenço, 2003
Buthus montanus Lourenço & Vachon, 2004
Buthus occidentalis Lourenço, Sun & Zhu, 2009
Buthus rochati Lourenço, 2003
Buthus tassili Lourenço, 2002
Buthus yemenensis Lourenço, 2008
Centruroides mahnerti Lourenço, 1983
Cercophonius himalayensis Lourenço, 1996
Chactas barravierai Lourenço, 1997
Chactas bonito Lourenço, 1996
Chactas braziliensis Lourenço, Aguiar & Franklin, 2005
Chactas brownelli Lourenço, 1997
Chactas hauseri Lourenço, 1997
Chactas koepckei Lourenço & Dastych, 2001
Chactas mahnerti Lourenço, 1995
Chactas mauriesi Lourenço & Florez, 1990
Chactas ozendai Lourenço, 1999
Chactopsis amazonica Lourenço & Francke, 1986
Chactopsis buhrnheimi Lourenço, 2003
Chaerilus chapmani Vachon & Lourenço, 1985
Chaerilus conchiformus Zhu, Han & Lourenço, 2008
Chaerilus laoticus Lourenço & Zhu, 2008
Chaerilus philippinus Lourenço & Ythier, 2008
Chaerilus sabinae Lourenço, 1995
Chaerilus telnovi Lourenço, 2009
Chaerilus tessellatus Qi, Zhu & Lourenço, 2005
Chaerilus vietnamicus Lourenço & Zhu, 2008
Charmus brignolii Lourenço, 2000
Charmus minor Lourenço, 2002
Chiromachetes tirupati Lourenço, 1997
Cicileus cloudsleythompsoni Lourenço, 1999
Compsobuthus andresi Lourenço, 2004
Compsobuthus garyi Lourenço & Vachon, 2001
Compsobuthus simoni Lourenço, 1999
Compsobuthus tofti Lourenço, 2001
Compsobuthus williamsi Lourenço, 1999
Congobuthus fagei Lourenço, 1999
Congobuthus Lourenço, 1999
Egyptobuthus Lourenço, 1999
Egyptobuthus vaissadei Lourenço, 1999
Euscorpiops karschi Qi, Zhu & Lourenço, 2005
Euscorpiops shidian Qi, Zhu & Lourenço, 2005
Euscorpiops vachoni Qi, Zhu & Lourenço, 2005
Euscorpiops yangi Zhu, Zhang & Lourenço, 2007
Gallioscorpio Lourenço & Gall, 2004
Gallioscorpio voltzi Lourenço & Gall, 2004
  Gallioscorpionidae Lourenço & Gall, 2004
Grosphus ankarafantsika Lourenço, 2003
Grosphus ankarana Lourenço & Goodman, 2003
Grosphus darainensis Lourenço, Goodman & Ramilijaona, 2004
Grosphus feti Lourenço, 1996
Grosphus garciai Lourenço, 2001
Grosphus goudoti Lourenço & Goodman, 2006
Grosphus intertidalis Lourenço, 1999
Grosphus mahafaliensis Lourenço, Goodman & Ramilijaona, 2004
Grosphus mandena Lourenço, 2005
Grosphus mayottensis Lourenço & Goodman, 2009
Grosphus olgae Lourenço, 2004
Grosphus polskyi Lourenço, Qi & Goodman, 2007
Grosphus simoni Lourenço, Goodman & Ramilijaona, 2004
Guyanochactas flavus Lourenço & Ythier, 2011
Hadogenes angolensis Lourenço, 1999
Hadrurochactas brejo (Lourenço, 1988)
Hadrurochactas mapuera (Lourenço, 1988)
Hadrurochactas polisi (Monod & Lourenço, 2001)
Hadruroides udvardyi Lourenço, 1995
Hemiscorpius acanthocercus Monod & Lourenço, 2005
Hemiscorpius enischnochela Monod & Lourenço, 2005
Heterometrus tibetanus Lourenço, Qi & Zhu, 2005
Heteroscorpion goodmani Lourenço, 1996
Heteroscorpion kraepelini Lourenço & Goodman, 2006
Heteroscorpion magnus Lourenço & Goodman, 2002
Heteroscorpion raselimananai Lourenço & Goodman, 2004
Himalayotityobuthus alejandrae Lourenço, 2003
Himalayotityobuthus Lourenço, 1997
Himalayotityobuthus martensi Lourenço, 1997
Hottentotta geffardi Lourenço, 2000
Hottentotta caboverdensis Lourenço & Ythier, 2006
Hottentotta mesopotamicus Lourenço & Qi, 2007
Isometrus thwaitesi pallidus Lourenço & Huber, 2002
Isometrus garyi Lourenço & Huber, 2002 Sri Lanka
Isometrus hainanensis Lourenço, 2005
Isometrus tibetanus Lourenço & Zhu, 2008
Leiurus jordanensis Lourenço, Modry & Amr, 2002
Leiurus savanicola Lourenço, Qi & Cloudsley-Thompson, 2006
Liocheles penta Francke & Lourenço, 1991
Lychas ceylonensis Lourenço & Huber, 1999
Mauritanobuthus geniezi Qi &Lourenço, 2007
Mauritanobuthus Qi & Lourenço, 2007
Mesobuthus songi Lourenço, Qi & Zhu, 2005
Microananteris Lourenço, 2003
Microananteris minor Lourenço, 2003
Microbuthus flavorufus Lourenço & Duhem, 2007
Microbuthus maroccanus Lourenço, 2002

Microcharmus Lourenço, 1995
Microcharmus bemaraha Lourenço, Goodman & Fisher, 2006
Microcharmus cloudsleythompsoni Lourenço, 1995
Microcharmus confluenciatus Lourenço, Goodman & Fisher, 2006
Microcharmus duhemi Lourenço, Goodman & Fisher, 2006
Microcharmus fisheri Lourenço, 1998
Microcharmus hauseri Lourenço, 1996
Microcharmus jussarae Lourenço, 1996
Microcharmus maculatus Lourenço, 1996
Microcharmus madagascariensis Lourenço, 1999
Microcharmus pauliani (Lourenço, 2004)
Microcharmus sabineae Lourenço, 1996
Microcharmus variegatus Lourenço, Goodman & Fisher, 2006
Microcharmus violaceous Lourenço, Goodman & Fisher, 2006
Microtityus starri Lourenço & Huber, 1999
Neobuthus cloudsleythompsoni Lourenço, 2001
Neobuthus sudanensis Lourenço, 2005
Neochactas fravalae (Lourenço, 1983)
Neochactas gaillardi (Lourenço, 1983)
Neochactas kelleri (Lourenço, 1997)
Neochactas mottai (Lourenço & Araujo, 2004)
Neochactas sissomi (Lourenço, 1983)
Neochactas skuki (Lourenço & Pinto-da-Rocha, 2000)
Neogrosphus blanci Lourenço, 1996
Neogrosphus Lourenço, 1995
Neoprotobuthus intermedius Lourenço, 2000
Neoprotobuthus Lourenço, 2000
Odontobuthus bidentatus Lourenço & Pezier, 2002
Opisthacanthus (Monodopisthacanthus) Lourenço, 2001
Opisthacanthus borboremai Lourenço & Fe, 2003
Opisthacanthus darainensis Lourenço & Goodman, 2006
Opisthacanthus lamorali Lourenço, 1981 Zimbabwe
Opisthacanthus lucienneae Lourenço & Goodman, 2006
Opisthacanthus maculatus Lourenço & Goodman, 2006
Opisthacanthus milloti Lourenço & Goodman, 2008
Opisthacanthus pauliani Lourenço & Goodman, 2008
Opisthacanthus piceus Lourenço & Goodman, 2006
Opisthacanthus valerioi Lourenço, 1980 Costa Rica
Orthochirus blandini (Lourenço & Vachon, 1997)
Orthochirus danielleae (Lourenço & Vachon, 1997) 
Orthochirus erardi (Lourenço & Vachon, 1997)
Orthochirus goyffoni (Lourenço & Vachon, 1995)
Orthochirus kaspareki (Lourenço & Huber, 2000)
Orthochirus kinzelbachi (Lourenço & Huber, 2000)
Orthochirus monodi (Lourenço & Vachon, 1997)
Orthochirus stockwelli (Lourenço & Vachon, 1995)
Palaeoakentrobuthus knodeli Lourenço & Weitschat, 2000
Palaeoakentrobuthus Lourenço & Weitschat, 2000 
Palaeoananteris Lourenço & Weitschat, 2001 
Palaeoananteris ribnitiodamgartensis Lourenço & Weitschat, 2001
Palaeoananteris wunderlichi Lourenço, 2004
Palaeoburmesebuthus grimaldii Lourenço, 2002
Palaeoburmesebuthus Lourenço, 2002 
  Palaeoeuscorpiidae Lourenço, 2003 
Palaeoeuscorpius gallicus Lourenço, 2003
Palaeoeuscorpius Lourenço, 2003 
Palaeogrosphus copalensis (Lourenço, 1996)
Palaeogrosphus Lourenço, 2000
Palaeoisometrus elegans Lourenço & Weitschat, 2005
Palaeoisometrus Lourenço & Weitschat, 2005
Palaeolychas balticus Lourenço & Weitschat, 1996
Palaeolychas Lourenço & Weitschat, 1996
Palaeoprotobuthus Lourenço & Weitschat, 2000
Palaeoprotobuthus pusillus Lourenço & Weitschat, 2000
Palaeospinobuthus cenozoicus Lourenço, Henderickx & Weitschat, 2005 
Palaeospinobuthus Lourenço, Henderickx & Weitschat, 2005
Palaeotityobuthus longiaculeus Lourenço & Weitschat, 2000
Palaeotityobuthus Lourenço & Weitschat, 2000
Paleocheloctonus Lourenço, 1996
Palaeocheloctonus pauliani Lourenço, 1996
Pantobuthus complicatus Lourenço & Duhem, 2009
Pantobuthus Lourenço & Duhem, 2009

  Protobuthidae Lourenço & Gall, 2004
Protobuthus Lourenço & Gall, 2004
Protobuthus elegans Lourenço & Gall, 2004
  Protoischnuridae Carvalho & Lourenço, 2001
Protoischnurus axelrodorum Carvalho & Lourenço, 2001
Protoischnurus Carvalho & Lourenço, 2001
Pseudolissothus Lourenço, 2001
Pseudolissothus pussilus Lourenço, 2001
Pseudouroplectes betschi Lourenço, 1995
Pseudouroplectes Lourenço, 1995
Pseudouroplectes lalyae Lourenço & Ythier, 2010
Pseudouroplectes maculatus Lourenço & Goodman, 2006
Pseudouroplectes pidgeoni Lourenço & Goodman, 1999
Rhopalurus amazonicus Lourenço, 1986
Rhopalurus lacrau Lourenço & Pinto-da-Rocha, 1997
Rhopalurus piceus Lourenço & Pinto-da-Rocha, 1997
Sabinebuthus elegans Lourenço, 2001
Sabinebuthus Lourenço, 2001
Saharobuthus elegans Lourenço & Duhem, 2009
Saharobuthus Lourenço & Duhem, 2009
Scorpiops afghanus Lourenço & Qi, 2006
Scorpiops atomatus Qi, Zhu & Lourenço, 2005
Scorpiops langxian Qi, Zhu & Lourenço, 2005
Scorpiops luridus Qi, Zhu & Lourenço, 2005
Scorpiops pococki Qi, Zhu & Lourenço, 2005
Tarsoporosus anchicaya Lourenço & Flórez, 1990
Teuthraustes giupponi Lourenço & Ythier, 2017
Teuthraustes khodayarii Lourenço & Ythier, 2017
Teuthraustes kuryi Lourenço & Ythier, 2017
Teuthraustes guerdouxi Lourenço, 1995
Teuthraustes lisei Lourenço, 1994
Tibetiomachus himalayensis Lourenço & Qi, 2006
Tibetiomachus Lourenço & Qi, 2006
Tityobuthus antsingy Lourenço & Goodman, 2004
Tityobuthus betschi Lourenço, Qi & Goodman, 2008
Tityobuthus chelbergorum Lourenço, Qi & Goodman, 2008
Tityobuthus darainensis Lourenço & Goodman, 2002
Tityobuthus dastychi Lourenço, 1997
Tityobuthus griswoldi Lourenço, 2000
Tityobuthus guillaumeti Lourenço, 1995
Tityobuthus ivohibe Lourenço & Goodman, 1999
Tityobuthus judsoni Lourenço, 1996
Tityobuthus lucileae Lourenço, 1996
Tityobuthus manonae Lourenço, 2000
Tityobuthus mccarteri Lourenço, Qi & Goodman, 2008
Tityobuthus monodi Lourenço, 2000
Tityobuthus pallidus Lourenço, 2004
Tityobuthus parrilloi Lourenço, 1996
Tityobuthus petrae Lourenço, 1996
Tityobuthus pococki Lourenço, 1995
Tityobuthus rakotondravonyi  Lourenço, 2003 
Tityus adisi Lourenço, 2002
Tityus adrianoi Lourenço, 2003
Tityus anneae Lourenço, 1997
Tityus antioquensis Lourenço& Otero Patiño, 1998
Tityus apiacas Lourenço, 2002
Tityus bahiensis eickstedtae Lourenço, 1982
Tityus bastosi Lourenço, 1984
Tityus betschi Lourenço, 1992
Tityus blanci Lourenço, 1994
Tityus brazilae Lourenço & Eickstedt, 1984
Tityus canopensis Lourenço, 2002
Tityus cerroazul Lourenço, 1986
Tityus chilensis Lourenço, 2005
Tityus cisandinus Lourenço & Ythier, 2017
Tityus confluens bodoquena Lourenço, Cabral & Bruehmueller Ramos, 2004
Tityus crassicauda Lourenço & Ythier, 2013
Tityus cuellari Lourenço, 1994
Tityus demangei Lourenço, 1981
Tityus dinizi Lourenço, 1997
Tityus elizabethae Lourenço & Ramos, 2004
Tityus erikae Lourenço, 1999
Tityus exstinctus Lourenço, 1995
Tityus florezi Lourenço, 2000
Tityus gaffini Lourenço, 2000
Tityus gasci Lourenço, 1982
Tityus jeanvellardi Lourenço, 2001
Tityus julianae Lourenço, 2005
Tityus jussarae Lourenço, 1988
Tityus kuryi Lourenço, 1997
Tityus lokiae Lourenço, 2005
Tityus marajoensis Lourenço & da Silva, 2007
Tityus maranhensis Lourenço, de Jesus Junior & Limeira-de-Oliveira, 2006
Tityus martinpaechi Lourenço, 2001
Tityus matthieseni Lourenço & Pinto-da-Rocha, 2000
Tityus melici Lourenço, 2003
Tityus mongei Lourenço, 1996
Tityus munozi Lourenço, 1997
Tityus neblina Lourenço, 2008
Tityus nelsoni Lourenço, 2005
Tityus oteroi Lourenço, 1998
Tityus paulistorum Lourenço & Qi, 2006
Tityus pintodarochai Lourenço, 2005
Tityus potameis Lourenço & Leão Giupponi, 2004
Tityus prancei Lourenço, 2000
Tityus raquelae Lourenço, 1988
Tityus rebieri Lourenço, 1997
Tityus rionegrensis Lourenço, 2006
Tityus roigi Maury & Lourenço, 1987
Tityus sabinae Lourenço, 1994
Tityus sastrei Lourenço & Flórez, 1990
Tityus sylviae Lourenço, 2005
Tityus tayrona Lourenço, 1991
Tityus tucurui Lourenço, 1988
Tityus unus Lourenço & Pinto-da-Rocha, 2000
Tityus ythieri Lourenço, 2007
Tityus vaissadei Lourenço, 2002
Troglokhammouanus Lourenço, 2007
Troglokhammouanus steineri Lourenço, 2007
Troglorhopalurus Lourenço, Baptista & Giupponi, 2004
Troglorhopalurus translucidus Lourenço, Baptista & Giupponi, 2004
  Troglotayosicidae Lourenço, 1998
Troglotayosicus Lourenço, 1981
Troglotayosicus vachoni Lourenço, 1981
Troglotityobuthus Lourenço, 2000
Uroplectes machadoi Lourenço, 2000
Uroplectoides abyssinicus Lourenço, 1998
Uroplectoides Lourenço, 1998
Vachoniochactas ashleeae Lourenço, 1994

References

French arachnologists